Melanie Howard (born 10 May 1993) is an Australian rugby league footballer who plays for the Sydney Roosters in the NRL Women's Premiership and the Central Coast Roosters in the NSWRL Women's Premiership.

Background
Born in Gosford, New South Wales, Howard played her junior rugby for the Northern Lakes Warriors.

Playing career
In June 2018, Howard represented NSW Country at the inaugural Women's National Championships.

On 31 July 2018, she signed with the St George Illawarra Dragons in the NSWRL Women's Premiership.

In Round 1 of the 2018 NRL Women's season, she made her debut for the Dragons in a 4–30 loss to the Brisbane Broncos. On 6 October 2018, she represented the Prime Minister's XIII in their 40–4 win over Papua New Guinea.

In May 2019, she represented NSW Country at the Women's National Championships. On 26 June 2019, she joined the Sydney Roosters NRLW team.

On 13 November 2020, she made her State of Origin debut for New South Wales in their 18–24 loss to Queensland.

References

External links
Sydney Roosters profile

1993 births
Living people
Australian female rugby league players
Rugby league halfbacks
Rugby league five-eighths
St. George Illawarra Dragons (NRLW) players
Sydney Roosters (NRLW) players